The Yanbian University of Science and Technology (YUST;), is a research university in the city of Yanji, Jilin, China. 

YUST is the first Korean Chinese joint-venture university in the Yanbian Korean Autonomous Prefecture and first international university in China.

History

1990–1995 
 1990.01 A foundation for the Chinese-Korean Technology University is established and registered legally in the United States.
 1990.03 The three-year technical college becomes a four-year technology university.
 1991.03 The Jilin Province Board of Education ratifies the establishment of the university.
 1991.04 The YUST Supporters’ Committee is approved by the South Korean Foreign Affairs Department.
 1991.06 The Chinese National Board of Education ratifies the establishment of the university.
 1992.06 The university and the Chinese National Institute of Science and Technology ratify the Yanbian Mid and Long Range Land Development Plan
 1992.09 The university is renamed Yanbian University of Science and Technology. The Industrial Technology Training School, an auxiliary branch of YUST, is established. (It is composed of the Industrial Information Training Institute, the Construction Technology Training Institute, and the Kia Training Institute.) The main buildings and the academic buildings are finished.
 1993.04 A committee for development and promotion is organized.
 1993.07 The first graduation ceremony of the Industrial Information Training Institute is held (200 students).
 1993.09 A four-year college and a two-year college of YUST start classes. The East Asia Technology Training Institute is founded. The second opening ceremony for the Kia Training Institute is held. Construction of the cafeteria and dormitory are completed.
 1993.10 An academic exchange program is established with Yonsei University.
 1994.04 An academic exchange program is established with Songsil University.
 1994.09 The four-year college, the two-year college, and the East Asia and Kia Training Institutes enroll new students for the second year. An academic exchange program is established with Hanyang University.
 1995.02 An academic exchange program is established with Postech.
 1995.05 An academic exchange program is established with Liberty University and InJe University.
 1995.07 59 students of the two-year college and 77 trainees of the training institute graduate.
 1995.09 The Korean Language Department (three-year college) is established. Tennis and basketball courts are constructed beside the athletic field. Second dormitory construction starts.
 1995.11 An academic exchange program is established with CUST.
 1995.12 The Yanbian Information and Culture Public Relations, belonging to Continuing Education, is founded.

Departments

School of Bio and Chemical Engineering

Bio-Chemical Engineering Department
The goal is to use living things directly and indirectly and to teach processes and steps that produce and process materials people need, including microorganisms and animal and plant cells.

Chemical Process and Technology Department
The goal is to teach chemical process and technology and to train technical experts in process design. The situation in China indicates that the information taught by the Chemical Process and Technology Department is very important. The department trains students to engage in science research in the field of chemical technology, delicate chemistry, energy, light industry, pharmacology, and environment protection.

School of Materials, Mechanical and Automation Engineering
The main goal is to educate competitive students with comprehensive knowledge of interdisciplinary subjects such as materials and mechanical processing, mechatronics and automatic control.
The students will build creative design capability in computers and foreign languages, will be international business minded and good traders with a pioneer spirit and venture consciousness.

School of Computer, Electronic and Communication Engineering

Electronics and Computer Engineering Department
The department combines fields of expertise and develops knowledge for manufacturing new products. It trains experts who can develop and use software and hardware.

Communication Engineering Department
The goal is to train advanced experts who are needed for communication engineering.

The department teaches subjects in information management, interchange and transmission that include multimedia information and technology of electronic communication engineering. Students learn basic theory of communication engineering technology through practicing communication engineering projects in the lab. They learn the technology of designing communication networks and the operation of relaying devices as well as the technology of designing communication networks and the operation of relaying devices.

School of Construction Engineering
The division is established for continuation and development of Korean architectural culture in China by introducing emerging trends of modern architecture. The school started with 17 students in September 1996. In September 2000 the department got permission to confer bachelor's degrees in architecture. The school comprises 13 staff and 160 students.

School of Business
School of Business consists of the departments of Management Information Systems (MIS) and International Economics and Trade (IET). More than 25 faculty members from South Korea, the United States. Germany, China, Japan and Taiwan are teaching business courses.

Students are expected to learn advanced and practical knowledge in global business environment. Competency in computer and information technology. Fluency in English, Korean, and Chinese are expected for all students. Students are expected to develop leadership characters based on integrity and openness.

The Business School provides intensive learning experience based on close relationship of professors and students through high ratio of professor and students at less than 1:15. The school emphasize practical business sense and global mind through education systems. the students are mandated to have hands-on experience in business through the internship and training programs. The students also have many opportunities to be exposed to different cultures.

More than 25% of the students have opportunity of participating in an exchange program to Korea, China, and the United States (expected) at least for a semester. The students have chances to interact with foreign professors during summer semester; every year, around 15 visiting scholars from abroad visit the school and teach five-week courses to the students. More than 5% of graduating students of the school enter renowned graduate schools all over the world.

School of East Languages
The department aims to teach the students to understand Korean culture profoundly and to train them in speaking through the process of exchange student programs and studying of training in South Korea.

School of Foreign Languages

German Language Department
The YUST German Department was founded in 2000 as part of the YUST School of Foreign Languages. Besides English and Korean languages it is possible to major in the German Language. The German studies are meant for students who have the intention of working for a German company in China, teaching German as a foreign language, or studying in one of the German-speaking countries of Europe. German major classes are of some interest to the students of other departments who have the same intention.

English Language Department
The department trains the students in English conversation, interpretation, translation, and composition.

School of Nursing

School
The university operates an unaccredited K-12 school for foreign students, Yanbian International Academy.

See also

Pyongyang University of Science and Technology
Yust Pust Foundation

References 

Universities and colleges in Jilin
Buildings and structures in Yanbian
Education in Yanbian
Educational institutions established in 1992
1992 establishments in China